V1073 Scorpii is a variable star in the constellation Scorpius. It has a non-Greek Bayer designation of k Scorpii. The star has a blue-white hue and is visible to the naked eye with an apparent visual magnitude that fluctuates around +4.87. It has an absolute magnitude of −6.8

This object is a massive supergiant star with a stellar classification of B0.7 Ia. It is an α Cygni variable; a supergiant that pulsates erratically on a timescale of days to weeks with an amplitude of less than a tenth of a magnitude. A simplistic fitting of Hipparcos data suggests a periodicity of 1.6 days. The star is around 4.2 million years old and is a member of the Upper Scorpius subgroup of the Sco OB2 association. V1073 Scorpii is considered a "runaway" star, showing a peculiar velocity of more than 37 km/s relative to its neighbourhood. No bow shock has been detected from its motion through interstellar space.

V1073 Sco has a 14th magnitude visual companion, which is an unrelated background object according to its Gaia Data Release 2 parallax.

References

B-type supergiants
Alpha Cygni variables
Runaway stars

Scorpius (constellation)
Scorpii, k
Durchmusterung objects
154090
083574
6334
Scorpii, V1073
Upper Scorpius